McCloughan is an Irish surname. Notable people with the surname include:

Dave McCloughan (born 1966), American football player
Josh McCloughan (born 1975), Australian association football player
Kent McCloughan (born 1940), American football player and talent scout, father of Scot and Dave
Scot McCloughan (born 1971), American football general manager
James McCloughan (born 1946), Vietnam War veteran and United States Army Medal of Honor recipient